It's Academic is the name for a number of televised academic student quiz shows for high school students through the United States and internationally. It's Academic programs have notably aired on NBC-owned WRC-TV (and, as of October 29, 2022, PBS member station WETA-TV) in Washington, D.C., NBC affiliate WVIR-TV in Charlottesville, Virginia, and CBS-owned WJZ-TV in Baltimore, Maryland.

The Washington, D.C. version of the show has been on the air since October 7, 1961, and is recognized by the Guinness World Records as the longest-running quiz program in TV history. The program was created for WRC by Sophie Altman, who continued as executive producer until her death on May 24, 2008. Mac McGarry hosted the Washington shows from the beginning until June 25, 2011. Hillary Howard, a news anchor for Washington radio station WTOP-FM, took over as host subsequent to McGarry's official retirement in November 2011. The program is sponsored by philanthropist investor David Rubenstein and by the McLean, Virginia-based Mitre Corporation.

Format
The single-elimination tournament features 81 schools in the Washington metropolitan area, 81 schools in the Baltimore metropolitan area (including Western Maryland and the Eastern Shore), and nine schools in the Central Virginia region. The winners in each region go on to battle each other in the Super Bowl.

Each contest is composed of five rounds. Round 1 is a category round with eight themed questions (e.g. "the letter B" or "famous paintings"). Questions do not appear on the players' monitors but do appear for the home viewers. Each team is given 100 points before this round and teams receive 10 points for each correct answer and lose 10 for each incorrect answer.

In Round 2, each team is individually asked five questions and receive 20 points each for a correct answer, but do not lose points for an incorrect answer.

Round 3 is a toss-up visual round. The monitor displays an image and the host provides a question accompanying the image. Teams receive 20 points for each correct answer and lose 20 for each incorrect answer (10 until April 19, 2014 in Washington, Baltimore, and starting with the 2014 season in Charlottesville; other cities' visual rounds are still 10 points up or down). Eight questions are used. The fourth question is always a math question.

Before Round 4 the captain of each team introduces the sponsors and school administrators and coaches. Teams then select from three question packets. The team to the immediate left of the team that is supposed to answer chooses which packet the answering team will use. Eight questions are given to each team, with 20 points for a correct answer and no penalties. A 25-point bonus is given if a team correctly answers all eight questions, for a total of 185 points in this round. The fourth question is always a science question and the seventh question is always a math question (data from both those questions are displayed on the monitor or team's screen).

Round 5 features quick-fire toss-up questions, each worth +/-20 points. Visual questions are worth +/-30 points. The number of questions varies depending on the time left in the game. The game ends when the buzzer sounds, home viewers may realize that the game will come to a close while the countdown clock appears on the television screen. If a team has buzzed in prior the buzzer sounding, the team is required to answer the question before the game is considered over. If there is a tie in the knockout round (e.g. the final), the presenter may ask one last tie-breaker question to determine the winner.

After the host has announced the teams' final scores, the studio audience is invited down from the stands to join the contestants on camera during the closing credit sequence. In the Washington version from about 1976 to June 2017, the song heard under the credit roll (if there are no musicians from any of the competing schools) was "T.L.C. (Tender Loving Care)" by the band MFSB (a new theme was introduced in Washington for the 2017–18 season, entitled "Just Let Go", by Marti Amado and Ron Bolton, music production by Network Music which is used throughout the show).

As a result of the COVID-19 pandemic in the United States, later episodes in the 2019–2020 season were played in a remote format, with teams in separate locations, and without buzzers. Teams were recorded separately, and were not aware of other teams' scores.  The competition will return to the studio in late winter/early spring 2023.

Discontinued rounds
Prior to the adoption of the current format, there were several other formats of play.

Category round
The "very fast" category round consisted of questions pertaining to the same category. In some cases, the question was the same throughout the round:  teams were given different items, and had to answer the common question on the basis of each item (e.g., given a state, name either senator from that state). In other cases, all the answers in the category round shared an announced characteristic in common (e.g., geographical locations whose names begin and end with "A"). Teams used their buzzers in this round, earning 10 points for a correct answer, but losing 10 points (later 20 points) for wrong answers.

Timed round
In all forms, a team individually answers questions from a packet within a time limit. In one form, at the beginning of the game, teams get one minute to answer questions for 20 points each. In this form, teams are not penalized for wrong answers, in order to help the teams in "building score". In another form, teams have one and a half minutes to answer questions for 20 points each. However, 20 points are deducted for a wrong answer. Teams may pass a question, losing 10 points; however, the other two teams may buzz-in to answer the passed questions (with a few exceptions) for plus or minus 20 points after the time runs out for the team's turn. Every question that is fully read must be answered or passed within a reasonable time. However, if a question is not finished when time expires, the team may reject it without penalty or answer the question at their own risk. In this form, getting all 10 questions (later eight) correct originally earned the team a 50-point bonus, later reduced to 25.

Scrimmage round
A "scrimmage round" was once used during the 1977–78 Buffalo season championship, as well as in Washington and Baltimore through much of the 1970s, and also in Cleveland at about that time. Teams were instructed to "use [their] lights and buzzers" for a "one-minute scrimmage round." 10 points were scored for a correct answer, with no penalties.

Guest questions

Beginning in 2008, telecasts on the WRC-TV version have included "guest questions" from notable persons in government, business, sports, and the arts. Among those seen in pre-recorded videos are:

 Stephen Breyer, US Supreme Court Justice
 Lynda Carter, Actress
 Elaine Chao, US Secretary of Labor
 G. Wayne Clough, director of the Smithsonian Institution
 Gen. Jack Dailey, director of the National Air and Space Museum
 Tom Donohue, president of the U.S. Chamber of Commerce
 David Gregory, host of Meet the Press
 Miguel Insulza, Secretary-General of Organization of American States
 Tim Kaine, governor of Virginia
 Ted Leonsis, owner, Washington Capitals and Washington Wizards
 Carl Levin, U.S. Senator from Michigan
 Chris Matthews, NBC News
 Barbara Mikulski, U.S. Senator from Maryland
 Rusty Powell, director of the National Gallery of Art
 Cal Ripken Jr., member of Baseball Hall of Fame
 Tim Russert, television journalist and moderator on Meet the Press
 Chuck Schumer, U.S. Senator from New York and Senate Majority Leader
 Leonard Slatkin, music director of Washington and Detroit orchestras
 Margaret Spellings, U.S. Secretary of Education
 John Sweeney, president of AFL–CIO
 Clarence Thomas, Supreme Court Justice
 Jim Webb, U.S. Senator from Virginia
 Elias Zerhouni, director of the National Institutes of Health

Spin-offs

An Australian version of the show aired on Network 10 and the Seven Network from 1968 to 1975, and was revived by Seven's Perth affiliate in 2001. Seven took the show national in 2005.

A New Zealand version was also screened by TVNZ in the 1980s, with Lockwood Smith and John Hayden as hosts.

WNBC in New York aired a local edition of It's Academic from approximately 1963 through at least 1972, hosted most of the time by Art James, with Lee Leonard filling in for a year.

WMAQ-TV in Chicago had a version in the 1960s and 1970s under the It's Academic name, hosted by Ed Grennan. The show debuted on September 29, 1962, with Arlington High School facing off against Homewood-Flossmoor High School.

WLWT, WCPO-TV and WCET in Cincinnati aired a local It's Academic from October 13, 1963 to May 30, 1982.  The Cincinnati hosts included Dave Manning, Lloyd Baldwin, Steve Douglas and Claire Slemmer.

A version of It's Academic aired on WBEN-TV in Buffalo from January 27, 1968 through 1986, hosted by sportscaster Van Miller. It was later revived for a few months in 2008 by WGRZ, with Kevin O'Neill as host. The show returned to the area starting January 12, 2013 and is hosted by O'Neill and produced by Full Circle Studios for broadcast on NBC affiliate WGRZ.

A show using the It's Academic name aired in Richmond, Virginia on the NBC affiliate, WWBT Channel 12, from November 22, 1975 to June 26, 1976 (the Richmond championship aired on May 16, 1976), which was also hosted by Mac McGarry and sponsored by Giant. That was replaced by Battle of the Brains. Battle of the Brains has also replaced a version of It's Academic that aired in Hampton Roads.

The World Affairs Council, in conjunction with the United States Department of State, hosted an It's Academic International event in 2002, also hosted by Mac McGarry.

KHII-TV in Honolulu currently airs a local version titled It's Academic Hawaii which is hosted by Billy V (from Hawaii News Now-Sunrise). It was previously hosted by Rick Hamada and Keahi Tucker.

WEWS in Cleveland has had a version of the series since 1964. It was originally titled It's Academic and hosted by Don Cameron. In 1972, the series changed its name to Academic Challenge with host Don Webster, later replaced by Lou Maglio; the series later reverted to its former title during the mid-1990s, at which time Webster also returned as emcee. After a 35 consecutive year run and a brief hiatus, Academic Challenge returned to the WEWS airwaves in 2003 with host Adam Shapiro. Danita Harris hosted the 2006 season; from 2007 to 2016, Jason Nicholas was the host, succeeded by Hakem Dermish in December 2016 after Nicholas left WEWS. Dermish was succeeded by WCPN host Rick Jackson on April 28, 2018 after Dermish left WEWS for CBS Sports in New York, while Jackson was subsequently replaced by Rob Powers for the 2019 season.

While not a spinoff, the UK has a similar series, University Challenge, which has been on air since 1962, making it only slightly younger than It's Academic. It was featured in the British sitcom The Young Ones where one of the characters, Adrian, used a Stielhandgranate against another university team.

Notable contestants
Notable people who have competed on It's Academic include: 
 Matt Amodio, former Jeopardy contestant
 Michael Chabon, Pulitzer Prize-winning author
 Bruce Cohen, Oscar-winning producer of American Beauty
 David Ignatius, journalist and novelist
 Joshua Foer, writer
 Donald E. Graham, chairman and chief executive officer of Graham Holdings
 Angus King, U.S. Senator from Maine
 Laura Lippman, author
 Jon Callas, cryptographer
 Peter Salovey, President of Yale University
 Charles Schumer, U.S. Senator from New York
 George Stephanopoulos, political commentator
 Michael Stryker, neuroscientist. 
 Ian Terry, Big Brother 14 winner
 Mike D'Orso, journalist/author
 Merrick B. Garland, U.S. Attorney General under President Joe Biden
Other notable participants:
 Sandra Bullock appeared on the show as a cheerleader.
 Hillary Clinton was an alternate for Maine South High School in 1965 on WMAQ-TV (Chicago).

In 1979, a charity special was held between a team of three Democratic senators (Patrick Moynihan, Lloyd Bentsen, and Alan Cranston), three Republican senators (Lowell Weicker, John Danforth, and John Heinz), and three members of the press (Jessica Savitch, Art Buchwald, and David Broder). The special was handily won by the press team.

Champions
(Note: bold denotes Super Bowl Champions (since 1972).)

{|class="wikitable" border="1
!Year !! Winners
|-
| 1961
| Washington: St. Albans School
|-
| 1963
| Washington: Oxon Hill High School
|-
| 1964
| Washington: Oxon Hill High School
|-
| 1965
| Washington: Walt Whitman High SchoolCleveland: Magnificat High School
|-
| 1967
| New York, NY: Plainview - Old Bethpage John F. Kennedy High SchoolCincinnati: Walnut Hills High School
|-
| 1968
|Washington: Fairfax High School
|-
| 1969
| Washington: Walt Whitman High School
|-
| 1972
| Washington: Walt Whitman High SchoolBaltimore: Gilman SchoolNew York, NY St. Anthony's High School, Smithtown, NYChicago: Joliet East High School
|-
| 1973
| Baltimore: Randallstown High SchoolWashington: Bethesda-Chevy Chase High SchoolCleveland: West Geauga High School
|-
| 1974
| Washington: Herndon High SchoolBaltimore: Randallstown High SchoolCleveland: Barberton High School (Ohio)
|-
| 1975
| Washington: Walt Whitman High SchoolBaltimore: Randallstown High School
|-
| 1976
| Washington: Northwood High SchoolBaltimore: Archbishop Curley High SchoolRichmond, VA: Collegiate SchoolBuffalo: Mount Saint Mary Academy
|-
| 1977
| Washington: Bethesda-Chevy Chase High School|-
| 1978
| Washington: Northwood High SchoolBuffalo: Nichols School
|-
| 1979
| Washington: Bethesda-Chevy Chase High SchoolBaltimore: Franklin High School (Reisterstown, Maryland)Buffalo: Grand Island High SchoolCincinnati: St. Xavier High School
|-
| 1980
| Washington: Walt Whitman High SchoolBaltimore: Randallstown High SchoolBuffalo: Iroquois Central School DistrictCincinnati: St. Xavier High School
|-
| 1981
| Washington: Holton-Arms SchoolCincinnati: St. Xavier High School
|-
| 1982
| Washington: Walt Whitman High School|-
| 1983
| Washington: Bethesda-Chevy Chase High SchoolBaltimore: Dulaney High School
|-
| 1984
| Baltimore: Dulaney High SchoolWashington: Rockville High School
|-
| 1985
| Washington: Walt Whitman High SchoolBaltimore: Dulaney High SchoolBuffalo: Williamsville East High School
|-
| 1986
| Washington: Bethesda-Chevy Chase High SchoolBaltimore: Wilde Lake High School
|-
| 1987
| Washington: Bethesda-Chevy Chase High SchoolBaltimore: Wilde Lake High SchoolCentral Virginia: St. Anne's-Belfield School
|-
| 1988
| Baltimore: Dulaney High SchoolWashington: Walt Whitman High School
Buffalo: West Seneca West Senior High School
|-
| 1989
| Washington: Georgetown Day SchoolCentral Virginia: Thomas Jefferson High School for Science and TechnologyBaltimore: Dulaney High School
|-
| 1990
| Baltimore: Oakland Mills High School Washington: Rockville High School Central Virginia: St. Anne's-Belfield School
|-
| 1991
| Baltimore: Dulaney High SchoolWashington: Walt Whitman High School
|-
| 1992
| Baltimore: Wilde Lake High SchoolWashington: Thomas Jefferson High School for Science and Technology
|-
| 1993
| Washington: Thomas Jefferson High School for Science and TechnologyBaltimore: Gilman School
|-
| 1994
| Baltimore: Linganore High SchoolWashington: Eleanor Roosevelt High SchoolCentral Virginia: Woodberry Forest School
|-
| 1995
| Washington: Montgomery Blair High SchoolCentral Virginia: Woodberry Forest School
|-
| 1996
| Washington: Georgetown Day SchoolCentral Virginia: Woodberry Forest SchoolBaltimore: Mount Saint Joseph High School
|-
| 1997
| Washington: Georgetown Day SchoolBaltimore: Oakland Mills High SchoolCentral Virginia: Charlottesville High SchoolCleveland: Lakewood High School
|-
| 1998
| Washington: Gonzaga College High SchoolBaltimore: Hammond High School
|-
| 1999
| Washington: Rockville High SchoolBaltimore: Towson High SchoolCleveland: Copley High School
|-
| 2000
| Baltimore: Howard High SchoolWashington: Eleanor Roosevelt High SchoolCentral Virginia: Staunton High School
|-
| 2001
| Washington: Eleanor Roosevelt High SchoolBaltimore: Howard High School
|-
| 2002
| Baltimore: Howard High SchoolWashington: Holton-Arms SchoolPittsburgh: Ringgold High School
|-
| 2003
| Washington: Holton-Arms SchoolBaltimore: Centennial High School
|-
| 2004
| Baltimore: Howard High SchoolWashington: Richard Montgomery High SchoolCleveland: Solon High School
|-
| 2005
| Washington: Walter Johnson High SchoolBaltimore: Centennial High SchoolCentral Virginia: Staunton High SchoolCleveland: Solon High School
|-
| 2006
| Washington: Richard Montgomery High SchoolBaltimore: Hammond High SchoolCentral Virginia: Charlottesville High SchoolCleveland: Copley High School
|-
| 2007
| Washington: Walter Johnson High SchoolBaltimore: Centennial High SchoolCentral Virginia: Staunton High SchoolCleveland: Gilmour Academy
|-
| 2008
| Washington: Rockville High SchoolBaltimore: Mount Saint Joseph High SchoolCentral Virginia: Charlottesville High SchoolCleveland: Hawken SchoolPittsburgh: Shady Side AcademyBuffalo, NY: Iroquois Central School District
|-
| 2009
| Baltimore: Centennial High SchoolWashington:  Montgomery Blair High SchoolCentral Virginia: Charlottesville High SchoolCleveland: Archbishop Hoban High SchoolPittsburgh: Uniontown Area High School
|-
| 2010
| Washington: Rockville High SchoolCentral Virginia:  Charlottesville High SchoolBaltimore: Gilman SchoolCleveland: Copley High SchoolPittsburgh: Hampton High School
|-
| 2011
| Washington: Wilbert Tucker Woodson High SchoolBaltimore: Walkersville High SchoolCentral Virginia: Rappahannock County High SchoolCleveland: St. Edward High School
|-
| 2012
| Washington: James Hubert Blake High SchoolBaltimore: Catonsville High SchoolCentral Virginia: Louisa County High SchoolCleveland: Firestone Community Learning CenterPittsburgh: Winchester Thurston SchoolHawaii: Waiakea High School
|-
| 2013
| Washington: James Hubert Blake High SchoolBaltimore: Centennial High SchoolCentral Virginia: Orange County High SchoolCleveland: Twinsburg High SchoolBuffalo, NY: Williamsville East High SchoolHawaii: Punahou School
|-
| 2014
| Washington: James Hubert Blake High SchoolBaltimore: James M. Bennett High SchoolCentral Virginia: Charlottesville High SchoolCleveland: Cloverleaf High SchoolBuffalo, NY: Williamsville East High School
|-
| 2015
| Washington: James Hubert Blake High SchoolBaltimore: Centennial High SchoolCentral Virginia: Rappahannock County High SchoolCleveland: Berea-Midpark High School
|-
| 2016
| Washington: Walt Whitman High SchoolBaltimore: Centennial High SchoolCentral Virginia: Staunton High SchoolCleveland: Solon High School
|-
| 2017
| Washington: Montgomery Blair High SchoolBaltimore: Centennial High SchoolCentral Virginia: Kettle Run High SchoolCleveland: Lakewood High SchoolHawaii: Kaiser High School 
|-
| 2018
| Washington: Montgomery Blair High SchoolBaltimore: Centennial High SchoolCentral Virginia: Stuarts Draft High SchoolCleveland: Westlake High School
|-
| 2019
|  Washington: Montgomery Blair High SchoolBaltimore: Walkersville High SchoolCentral Virginia: Kettle Run High School Cleveland: Revere High School
|-
| 2020
| Washington: Bethesda-Chevy Chase High SchoolBaltimore: Centennial High SchoolCentral Virginia: Fauquier High School
|-
|2021
|Washington: James Hubert Blake High School'Baltimore:  Howard High SchoolCentral Virginia: Western Albemarle High School
|-
| 2022
| Washington: McLean High SchoolCleveland: Avon Lake High School
|-
|}

References

External links
 Official It's Academic web site
 Washington DC area It's Academic
 Baltimore area It's Academic
 Cleveland area Academic Challenge
 It's Academic Hawaii
In September 2011, the VOA Special English service of the Voice of America broadcast a story about It's Academic'' on its weekly Education Report. A transcript and MP3 of the program, intended for English learners, can be found at A TV Quiz Show for Teens Turns 50

Television shows filmed in Washington, D.C.
Culture of Baltimore
Education in Washington, D.C.
Education in Baltimore
Student quiz television series
1960s American game shows
1970s American game shows
1980s American game shows
1990s American game shows
2000s American game shows
2010s American game shows
2020s American game shows
1961 American television series debuts
Franchised television formats